Jafarabad (also Romanized as Ja‘farābād; also known as Ja‘farābād-e Mo‘tamedīān) is a village in Zarrineh Rud-e Shomali Rural District, in the Central District of Miandoab County, West Azerbaijan Province, Iran. At the 2006 census, its population was 869, in 203 families.

References 

Populated places in Miandoab County